Pascal Siakam (born 2 April 1994) is a Cameroonian professional basketball player for the Toronto Raptors of the National Basketball Association (NBA). He is a two-time NBA All-Star and a two-time All-NBA selection. Siakam played college basketball for the New Mexico State Aggies and was named the Western Athletic Conference Player of the Year in 2016. Nicknamed "Spicy P", he was selected by Toronto with the 27th overall pick in the first round of the 2016 NBA draft. 

After being assigned to the NBA Development League (now the G League) as a rookie in 2017, Siakam led Toronto's affiliate team to a league championship and picked up Finals Most Valuable Player honors in the process. Siakam would later help the Raptors claim an NBA championship in 2019 while winning the league's Most Improved Player Award in the same season, the first player to win both during the same season. The Following season in 2020 , Siakam lead Toronto to the 2nd best record in the league while on his way to being named to his first NBA All-Star Game as a starter becoming the first player to play in the G-League to start and was named to the All-NBA Second team .

Early life
Siakam was born in Douala, Cameroon, to Tchamo and Victorie Siakam, the youngest of four brothers. His father, Tchamo, worked for a local transit company and was also the mayor of Makénéné. According to a story by Jackie MacMullan of ESPN, Pascal was effectively "hand-picked to embody his family's Catholicism." His father thus enrolled him in St. Andrew's Seminary in Bafia at age eleven. By the time he was fifteen, he did not want to become a Catholic priest.

Siakam initially had little interest in basketball in stark contrast to his older brothers, all of whom earned scholarships with the sport to various NCAA Division I colleges. He was discovered as a player at a local camp by Luc Mbah a Moute, whose parents' home in Bafia was about 2 miles (3 km) from St. Andrew's. Siakam attended Mbah a Moute's camp for the first time in 2011, a year before graduating from St. Andrew's; and he returned to it the following year, after which he was selected to attend the Basketball Without Borders camp. There, despite having had virtually no basketball experience at the time, he gained attention for his apparent athleticism and extremely high energy level. As Raptors president Masai Ujiri, who had been at this camp, recalled, "His effort was memorable." With Mbah a Moute as a mentor, Siakam moved to the United States at the age of eighteen. He went from one camp to the next to hone his skills before settling in Lewisville, Texas, and attending God's Academy. While at this prep school, Siakam was neither widely known nor initially eligible. But he was at least pursued by New Mexico State University; the Aggies' coach Marvin Menzies had Siakam on his radar since his pipeline of connections spanned several continents and his roster reserved fourteen spots for foreign-born players.

College career
Siakam enrolled at New Mexico State University in 2013. After redshirting the 2013–14 season due to injury, he worked his way onto the Aggies' starting lineup and then to Western Athletic Conference (WAC) Freshman of the Year honors by the 2014–15 campaign. For the 2015–16 campaign, he averaged 20.2 points, 11.6 rebounds, and 2.2 blocks across 34 games en route to earning unanimous WAC Player of the Year honors. On 19 April 2016, Siakam declared for the NBA draft, forgoing his final two years of college eligibility.

Professional career

Toronto Raptors (2016–present)

2016–17 season: G-League champion and Finals MVP
On 23 June 2016, Siakam was selected by the Toronto Raptors with the 27th overall pick in the NBA draft, with the franchise signing him to a rookie scale contract on 9 July. On October 26th, he became the first rookie to start for the Raptors' season-opener since Jonas Valančiūnas did so in 2012; rising to the occasion, he hauled in 9 rebounds and notched 4 points in 21 minutes as Toronto beat the Detroit Pistons, 109–91. It marked not only his NBA debut, but the first NBA game that he had ever seen in person. On 3 December, Siakam scored a season-high 14 points, which came in a 128–84 victory over the Atlanta Hawks. On 1 January 2017, during a 123–114 win over the Los Angeles Lakers, he pulled down a season-high 10 rebounds.

In his rookie season, Siakam started in as many as 38 games at power forward, including the first 35 of the 2016–17 campaign, because Jared Sullinger was out with injury; he was later replaced on the starting lineup by Lucas Nogueira on 5 January 2017. From 21 February through 28 April, he was alternately assigned to the Raptors 905 of the G-League and recalled from it. Accordingly, between games played for the Raptors, he led Toronto's affiliate team to the Finals and helped them win a title by defeating the Rio Grande Valley Vipers 2–1. After averaging 23 points and 9 rebounds in that series, he was named the G-League Finals MVP.

2017–18 season: Sophomore improvement
In his second year in the NBA, Siakam cemented himself as a productive bench contributor for Toronto. He recorded a then career-high 20 points during a 117–112 loss to the Golden State Warriors on 25 October 2017. For the 2017–18 season, the Raptors' offensive rating was four points better with Siakam on the floor, compared to seven points worse his rookie year. His averages improved from 4.3 points per game to 7.3, from 3.4 rebounds per game to 4.5, and from 0.3 assists per game to 2.0. He would draw comparisons to Warriors' forward Draymond Green for such qualities as his rare ability to guard all positions, his shrewd basketball IQ, and internal confidence.

2018–19 season: NBA champion and Most Improved Player 

Heading into the 2018–19 campaign, Siakam emerged as a two-way force, and he would average 16.9 points a night to go along with 6.9 rebounds and 3.1 assists; he would also make a marked improvement in shooting from distance, increasing his three-point percentage by 14 points to 36 percent. He surpassed his previous career-high on 29 October 2018, by posting 22 points during a 124–109 loss to the Milwaukee Bucks. On 10 November, he set a new career-high with 23 points scored in a 128–112 victory over the New York Knicks. Siakam was named the Eastern Conference Player of the Week for games played 5 to 11 November, thus becoming the eighth Raptor in franchise history to earn the award after DeMar DeRozan (10 times), Vince Carter (7 times), Chris Bosh (7 times), Kyle Lowry (4 times), Mike James, Jalen Rose, and Lou Williams. On 13 January, Siakam recorded 24 points and a career-high 19 rebounds in a 140–138 double-overtime win versus the Washington Wizards. On 13 February, he racked up a new career-high 44 points and hit a career-best 4 three-pointers in a 129–120 win over the Wizards; he thus became the 11th Raptor in franchise history to reach the 40-point plateau.

In Game 3 of the Raptors' first-round playoff series against the Orlando Magic, Siakam tallied 30 points and 11 rebounds in the 98–93 victory. In Game 1 of the second round, Siakam posted 29 points and 7 rebounds on 12-of-15 shooting from the field in a 108–95 victory over the Philadelphia 76ers. In Game 3 of the Eastern Conference Finals, Siakam helped Toronto defeat Milwaukee in double-overtime, 118–112, putting up 25 points and bringing down 11 rebounds; the win cut the Bucks' series lead to 2–1. In Game 6, Siakam converted 18 points for his part in the 100–94 win over Milwaukee; the victory clinched the series and propelled the Raptors to the NBA Finals for the first time in franchise history. In Game 1 of the 2019 Finals, Siakam scored a then playoff career-high 32 points with 8 rebounds, 5 assists and 2 blocks on 14-of-17 shooting from the field in a 118–109 victory over the Golden State Warriors. In Game 6 of the 2019 Finals, Siakam recorded a team high 26 points, 10 rebounds , 3 assists and hit the clinching shot for the title over Draymond Green , He went on to help the Raptors defeat the Warriors in six games and thus capture their first NBA championship in franchise history. At the 2019 Awards ceremony later that month, Siakam was named the NBA's Most Improved Player for the 2018–19 season. On 19 October 2019, Siakam agreed to a four-year, $130 million extension with Toronto.

2019–20 season: First All-Star and All-NBA appearances  
Siakam recorded 34 points, 18 rebounds, 5 assists, and 1 block in 38 minutes played of the NBA's season-opening game to help the Raptors beat the New Orleans Pelicans 130–122. He also matched his career-highs in both offensive rebounds and made free throws, and set a new career-high in field goals attempted. On 8 November, Siakam scored a career-high 44 points in a 122–104 win over the Pelicans. On 13 November, Siakam scored 36 points in a 114–106 win over the Portland Trail Blazers. On 1 December, Siakam scored 35 points in a 130–110 win over the Utah Jazz. On 23 January 2020, Siakam was selected to his first career All-Star nod, being named a starter in the 2020 NBA All-Star Game , Siakam became the first player to play in the G-League to start in the All-Star game . On 26 January, Siakam would again score 35 points in a 110–106 win over the San Antonio Spurs. On 21 February, Siakam scored 37 points along with 12 rebounds, in a 118–101 win over the Phoenix Suns. On 16 September, Siakam was named to the All-NBA Second Team.

2020–21 season: Missing playoffs 
On 6 January 2021, Siakam scored a season-high 32 points in a 123–115 loss against the Phoenix Suns. On 8 January, Siakam had 17 points, nine rebounds, and a career-high 12 assists in a 144–123 win against the Sacramento Kings. On 11 January, Siakam had his first career triple-double with 22 points, 13 rebounds, and 10 assists in a 112–111 loss against the Portland Trail Blazers. On 29 January, Siakam tied his season-high 32 points in a 126–124 loss against the Kings. On 5 February, Siakam had a new season-high 33 points while also getting 11 rebounds, six assists, three steals and a block in a 123–117 win against the Brooklyn Nets. On 2 May, Siakam scored a new season-high 39 points with 13 rebounds, four assists, two steals and two blocks in a 121–114 win against the Los Angeles Lakers. On 6 May, Siakam tied his career-high with 44 points along with 11 rebounds, seven assists and a steal in a 131–129 loss to the Washington Wizards.

2021–22 season: Second All-NBA selection 
On November 7, 2021, Siakam made his season debut coming off surgery scoring 15 points on a minutes restriction against the Brooklyn Nets. On November 19, Siakam recorded 32 points, 8 rebounds and 8 assists in a 108–89 win against the Sacramento Kings. On December 31, in a 116–108 win against the Los Angeles Clippers, Siakam had a statline of 25 points, a season-high 19 rebounds and 7 assists. On January 5, 2022, Siakam scored 33 points in a 117–111 win over the reigning champions Milwaukee Bucks. On January 15, Siakam recorded a statline of 30 points 10 assists and 8 rebounds in a 103-96 win with against the Milwaukee Bucks, the NBA stripping Siakam of two rebounds after previously recording 10 rebounds .  On January 25, Siakam tied his career best with 12 assists along with 24 points and 9 rebounds in a 125–113 win against the Charlotte Hornets.

On February 7, Siakam was named Eastern Conference Player of the Week for games played January 31 – February 6. He was averaging 25 points, 10.5 rebounds, 4.8 assists, 1.8 steals and 0.8 blocks leading the team to a 4–0 record in the week. On February 9, Siakam lead Toronto to their seventh straight win, logging 27 points, 16 rebounds and 5 assists on 13-of-17 shooting from the field in a blowout 117–98 win over the Oklahoma City Thunder. Siakam broke Chris Bosh's record of 20/10/5 games in a season with nine 20/10/5 games, surpassing Bosh's 8. On February 12, Siakam scored a then season-high 35 points, grabbed 10 rebounds, dished out 7 assists and had 2 steals in a 110–109 loss to the Denver Nuggets. On March 28, Siakam scored 25 of his season-high 40 points in the first half, grabbed 13 rebounds along with 3 steals and 2 blocks in a 115–112 overtime win over the Boston Celtics. On April 7, Siakam recorded his third career triple-double with 37 points, 11 rebounds, 12 assists and 2 steals in a 119–114 win over the Philadelphia 76ers. Siakam finished the regular season averaging a career high in rebounds, assists and steals.

On April 16, during Game 1 of the first round of the playoffs, Siakam logged 24 points, seven assists and three blocks in a 131–111 loss to the Philadelphia 76ers. On April 23, he posted a playoff career-high 34 points along with 8 rebounds, 5 assists and 2 blocks in a  110–102 Game 4 win. On April 25, he scored 23 points with 10 rebounds and 7 assists in a 103–88 Game 5 win pushing the series to a 6th game after Toronto was down 0–3. Toronto would go on to lose to Philadelphia in six games despite Siakam's 24-point, 7-rebound, 7-assist and 3-steals outing in the 132–97 close-out loss in Game 6. Siakam averaged 22.8 points, 7.8 rebounds and 5.8 assists in the 2022 playoffs. On May 24, Siakam was named to the All-NBA Third Team earning his second All-NBA selection and his second in 3 seasons tying Vince Carter and Demar DeRozan with the most All-NBA selections in Raptors history with two.

2022–23 season: Second All-Star selection 
On October 19, 2022, Siakam recorded 23 points, 11 rebounds, and four steals in a 108–105 win against in the Cleveland Cavaliers in the season-opener. On October 21, Siakam recorded his fourth career triple-double with 37 points, 12 rebounds, and 11 assists in a 109–105 loss against the Brooklyn Nets. Siakam also became the first player with multiple 30-point triple-doubles in Raptors history. On October 24 , Siakam recorded 23 points, 9 rebounds, 6 assists, 2 steals and 2 blocks and the go-ahead shot in a 98–90 win over the Miami Heat. On October 26, Siakam recorded 20 points, 5 rebounds and tied his career high with 13 assists in a 119–109 win over the Philadelphia 76ers. On October 31, Siakam dropped 31 points, 12 rebounds, 6 assists and 2 blocks in a 139–109 win over Atlanta Hawks, Siakam tied Vince Carter with the most 30 points, 10 rebounds and 5 assists games in Raptors history. On November 2, Siakam recorded his fifth career triple double with 22 points, 10 rebounds and 11 assists in a 143–100 blowout win over the San Antonio Spurs. On December 21, Siakam scored a career-high 52 points in a 113–106 win over the New York Knicks. This was tied for the second-most points in a game by a Raptors player. On December 26, Siakam was named Eastern Conference Player of the Week for Week 10 (December 19–25), averaging 38.7 points, 10.3 rebounds and 7.3 assists. Siakam was named an All-Star for the second time in his career as a reserve, replacing the injured Kevin Durant.

Player profile 
Siakam came into the NBA as a raw prospect but over the years has emerged as a high-end two-way wing player with playmaking and scoring ability, playing a variety of roles depending on the needs of the team.

Siakam is considered one of the NBA's most versatile players. During the 2021–22 season, Siakam started games at both center and point guard, showing an ability to read double teams and make high level reads, while averaging a career high 5.3 assists per game. 

Siakam is also considered one of the best defenders in the NBA. He is known for his ability to guard opposing players from the 1 through 5 positions, and for his efficiency as a rim protector in addition to being an excellent perimeter defender.  Moreover, Siakam has gained a reputation from the beginning of his career as one of the best transition players in the league.

Career statistics

NBA

Regular season

|-
| style="text-align:left;"|
| style="text-align:left;"|Toronto
| 55 || 38 || 15.6 || .502 || .143 || .688 || 3.4 || .3 || .5 || .8 || 4.2
|-
| style="text-align:left;"|
| style="text-align:left;"|Toronto
| 81 || 5 || 20.7 || .508 || .220 || .621 || 4.5 || 2.0 || .8 || .5 || 7.3
|-
| style="text-align:left; background:#afe6ba;"|
| style="text-align:left;"|Toronto
| 80 || 79 || 31.9 || .549 || .369 || .785 || 6.9 || 3.1 || .9 || .7 || 16.9
|-
| style="text-align:left;"|
| style="text-align:left;"|Toronto
| 60 || 60 || 35.2 || .453 || .359 || .792 || 7.3 || 3.5 || 1.0 || .9 || 22.9
|-
| style="text-align:left;"|
| style="text-align:left;"|Toronto
| 56 || 56 || 35.8 || .455 || .297 || .827 || 7.2 || 4.5 || 1.1 || .7 || 21.4
|-
| style="text-align:left;"|
| style="text-align:left;"|Toronto
| 68 || 68 || style="background:#cfecec;"|37.9* || .494 || .344 || .749 || 8.5 || 5.3 || 1.3 || .6 || 22.8
|- class="sortbottom"
| style="text-align:center;" colspan="2"|Career
| 400 || 306 || 29.5 || .489 || .328 || .774 || 6.3 || 3.1 || .9 || .7 || 15.7
|- class="sortbottom"
| style="text-align:center;" colspan="2"|All-Star
| 2 || 1 || 16.3 || .722 || .000 || .500 || 6.5 || 2.0 || .5 || .0 || 13.5

Playoffs

|-
| style="text-align:left;"|2017
| style="text-align:left;"|Toronto
| 2 || 0 || 5.0 || .000 ||  ||  || 1.5 || .5 || .5 || .0 || .0
|-
| style="text-align:left;"|2018
| style="text-align:left;"|Toronto
| 10|| 0 || 17.9 || .610 || .750 || .650 || 3.6 || .8 || .1 || .6 || 6.6
|-
| style="text-align:left; background:#afe6ba;"|2019
| style="text-align:left;"|Toronto
| style="background:#cfecec;"|  24* || style="background:#cfecec;"|  24* || 37.1 || .470 || .279 || .759 || 7.1 || 2.8 || 1.0 || .7 || 19.0
|-
| style="text-align:left;"|2020
| style="text-align:left;"|Toronto
| 11 || 11 || 38.0 || .396 || .189 || .717 || 7.5 || 3.8 || 1.1 || .4|| 17.0
|-
| style="text-align:left;"|2022
| style="text-align:left;"|Toronto
| 6 || 6 || 43.3 || .477 || .235 || .861 || 7.2 || 5.8 || 1.2 || 1.0 || 22.8
|- class="sortbottom"
| style="text-align:center;" colspan="2"|Career
| 53 || 41 || 33.2 || .459 || .258 || .757 || 6.3 || 2.9 || .8 || .6 || 15.9

College

|-
| style="text-align:left;"|2014–15
| style="text-align:left;"|New Mexico State
| 34 || 27 || 30.8 || .572 || .000 || .759 || 7.7 || 1.3 || .8 || 1.8 || 12.8
|-
| style="text-align:left;"|2015–16
| style="text-align:left;"|New Mexico State
| 34|| 34 || 34.6 || .539 || .200 || .678 || 11.6 || 1.7 || 1.0 || 2.2 || 20.3
|- class="sortbottom"
| style="text-align:center;" colspan="2"|Career
| 68 || 61 || 32.7 || .551 || .176 || .711 || 9.7 || 1.5 || .9 || 2.0|| 16.6

Personal life
Siakam is the son of Tchamo Siakam, the former mayor of Makénéné, Cameroon, and Victorie Siakam. When his father died in a car crash in October 2014, Siakam was unable to attend the funeral because he was waiting for the issuance of a new US visa. His three older brothers, Boris, Christian, and James, all played NCAA Division I basketball in the United States – Boris at Western Kentucky, Christian at IUPUI, and James at Vanderbilt. Siakam goes by the nickname "Spicy P". On February 14, 2023, Siakam and McDonald's Canada partnered on a limited edition McFlurry called the Siakam Swirl McFlurry. Inspired by Siakam’s iconic spin move and the Raptors team colours, this new flavour is made with vanilla soft serve, hot fudge, and crushed red Smarties.

See also
List of National Basketball Association annual minutes leaders

References

External links

 New Mexico State Aggies bio
 Siakam hoping to fulfill his late father's NBA dream

1994 births
Living people
Cameroonian expatriate basketball people in Canada
Cameroonian expatriate basketball people in the United States
Cameroonian men's basketball players
National Basketball Association All-Stars
National Basketball Association players from Cameroon
Toronto Raptors draft picks
Toronto Raptors players